Wiremu Hira Muru ( – 15 May 2020), commonly known as Rick Muru, was a New Zealand rugby league footballer who represented New Zealand.

Playing career
From Huntly, Muru played for the Taniwharau Rugby League Club in the Waikato Rugby League competition and represented Waikato. He also played for New Zealand Māori, including at the 1975 and 1977 Pacific Cups.

In 1980 Muru was selected to play for the New Zealand national rugby league team on their tour of Great Britain and France. He played in 5 games, scoring one try, but did not play in any of the test matches.

Later years
Muru was a member of the Tainui tribe and was a nephew of Robert Mahuta. Muru served as the chairman of the Waahi Marae Committee and was a board member of the Auckland Warriors when Tainui controlled the club.

In 2015, he was named at prop in Taniwharau's team of their first 70 years.

Muru died at Waahi Pā, Huntly, on 15 May 2020, aged 69.

References

1950s births
2020 deaths
New Zealand national rugby league team players
New Zealand rugby league administrators
New Zealand rugby league players
Place of birth missing
Rugby league players from Huntly, New Zealand
Rugby league props
Taniwharau Rugby League Club players
Waikato rugby league team players
Year of birth missing